Safe Haven is the debut studio album by Canadian singer-songwriter Ruth B. Released on May 5, 2017, when she was 21, the album garnered highly positive reviews and has been certified gold by Music Canada. Two of the songs from her debut extended play The Intro are included in the album. Those are "Lost Boy" and "Superficial Love", though the production for "Superficial Love" is different from that of the EP. The album was produced by Joel Little, Mike Elizondo and Ruth Berhe.

Background
In a 2017 interview, Ruth B. stated: "I have put the last couple years of my life into this album. My memories and stories  all make appearances in the melodies and hooks. My greatest hope is that these songs will resonate with listeners and find homes in their hearts". With producer Joel Little, she began recording the album in 2016 after the success of her debut EP. Little remarked that he became interested in working with Ruth B. after an acquaintance sent him some of her songs. "She had this phenomenal catalogue," he said, and compared her vocal style favorably with Lorde's. In addition to Joel Little, tracks on the album were produced by Mike Elizondo and Ruth Berhe.

Release
On November 11, 2016, the first promotional single, "In My Dreams", was released alongside a lyric video. April 20, 2017 spawned, "If This is Love", released as the second promotional single to build buzz for the album, followed by a lyric video and a live performance of the song released on YouTube. "Dandelions", the third promotional single, was released on April 27. The album was released in the CD, vinyl LP, and MP3 formats on May 5, 2017.

Critical reception

Jonathan Widran of Music Connection wrote that the album is a perfect showcase for her "soulful and dusky voice", and that the ballads and more uptempo songs are balanced perfectly.

Track listing

Charts

Certifications

References

2017 debut albums
Columbia Records albums
Albums produced by Joel Little